Reginald DeWayne Nelson (born June 23, 1976) is a former American football offensive tackle who played for the San Diego Chargers and Jacksonville Jaguars of the National Football League (NFL). He played college football at McNeese State University.

References 

1976 births
Living people
People from Alexandria, Louisiana
Players of American football from Louisiana
American football offensive tackles
McNeese Cowboys football players
San Diego Chargers players
Jacksonville Jaguars players